Melvin Horace Purvis II (October 24, 1903 – February 29, 1960) was an American law enforcement official and Federal Bureau of Investigation (FBI) agent. Given the nickname "Little Mel" because of his short,  frame, Purvis became noted for leading the manhunts that captured or killed bank robbers such as Baby Face Nelson, John Dillinger, and Pretty Boy Floyd, but his high public profile was resented by local law enforcement. Purvis asserted he had killed Floyd single-handed, others variously claimed that Floyd had been already wounded, or even that Purvis had ordered Floyd summarily shot dead for refusing to provide information.

Purvis had the reputation of torturing recalcitrant interviewees. Purvis became the FBI's golden boy, having captured more of designated public enemies than any other agent, but found himself sidelined after he began to enjoy better press than J. Edgar Hoover.

Early life
Purvis was born in Timmonsville, South Carolina, to Melvin Horace Purvis, Sr. (1869–1938), a tobacco farmer and businessman, and Janie Elizabeth (née Mims, 1874–1927); he was the fifth of eight siblings.

Career
Purvis was a well-educated man, and known to be a crack shot. He received his law degree from the University of South Carolina School of Law and had a brief career as a lawyer. Purvis was a member of the Kappa Alpha Order while attending South Carolina. He joined the FBI in 1927 and headed the Division of Investigation offices in Birmingham, Oklahoma City, and Cincinnati. In 1932, he was placed in charge of the Chicago office by Bureau of Investigation Director J. Edgar Hoover. He eventually led an investigation into the crash of United Airlines Trip 23, which uncovered foul play as the cause of the crash.

Purvis led the manhunts that tracked outlaws Baby Face Nelson and Pretty Boy Floyd, and most famously John Dillinger, which ended in Chicago on July 22, 1934. However, after Purvis became a media figure for this feat, Hoover claimed that Purvis had been demoted and agent Samuel P. Cowley had been put in charge of the Dillinger case. Cowley was later shot by Baby Face Nelson, and Purvis visited him in the hospital shortly before he died. Purvis was praised for his actions. He reportedly incurred the wrath of Hoover, who had previously supported him but now supposedly felt overshadowed. In a 2005 book co-written by Purvis's son Alston, Hoover is portrayed as jealous of the attention given to Purvis after Dillinger was killed.

Purvis resigned from the FBI in 1935 and afterwards practiced law.
In 1937, he became engaged to actress Janice Jarratt, but they never married. He later married Marie Rosanne Willcox, and they had three sons. In 1936, Purvis published a memoir of his years as an investigator with the Bureau, entitled American Agent.

Purvis became a Master Mason in Hampton Lodge No. 204, A.F.M. in 1947. 

Purvis served in the United States Army as an intelligence officer during World War II, reaching the rank of colonel. He assisted with compiling evidence against Nazi leaders in the Nuremberg trials.

Death
On February 29, 1960, Purvis was at his home in Florence, South Carolina, when he died from a gunshot wound to the head; the shot was fired from the pistol that was given to him by fellow agents when he resigned from the FBI. The FBI investigated his death and declared it a suicide, although the official coroner's report did not label the cause of death as such. A later investigation suggested that Purvis may have shot himself accidentally while trying to extract a tracer bullet. He was 56 years old.

Other media

In documentaries
Purvis was portrayed by Dale Robertson in G-MAN: The Rise and Fall of Melvin Purvis (1974), from SCETV's Carolina Stories documentary series (1974).
Purvis was portrayed by Scott Brooks in the History Channel documentary on infamous gangsters, Crime Wave: 18 Months of Mayhem (2008).
 Purvis was portrayed by actor Colin Price in the 2016 television series American Lawmen (S1E3): "Melvin Purvis: The Gang Buster" which aired on the American Heroes Channel

In films and TV movies
 Melvin Purvis - G-Man is a 1974 American TV movie about Melvin Purvis, starring Dale Robertson.
 Purvis was portrayed by Ben Johnson in the film Dillinger (1973).
 He was played by Geoffrey Binney in the TV movie The Story of Pretty Boy Floyd (1974).
 Purvis was portrayed again by Dale Robertson in the TV movie The Kansas City Massacre (1975), a sequel to Melvin Purvis - G-Man.
 He was portrayed by Michael Sacks in the film "The Private Files of J. Edgar Hoover" (1977).
 He was portrayed by Alan Vint in the film The Lady in Red (1979).
 He was portrayed by Will Patton in the TV movie Dillinger (1991).
 Purvis was originally portrayed by Chuck Wagner in the musical Dillinger, Public Enemy Number One (2002).
 Purvis is portrayed by Christian Bale in the film Public Enemies (2009).

In games
In 1937, Parker Brothers published a game called "Melvin Purvis' 'G'-Men Detective Game."

In literature
 Purvis appears with Eliot Ness as an agent of the "Federal Bureau of Ideology", in pursuit of labor activist Tom Joad, in Kim Newman's alternate history novel Back in the USSA (1997).
 Purvis is the title character in Denis Johnson's play, Purvis.

In television
Purvis appeared as a contestant on the game show To Tell The Truth (aired September 24, 1957).

References

Further reading
One Account of the Death of Pretty Boy Floyd

 J. Edgar Hoover: The Man and the Secrets, by Curt Gentry (1991).
 Official and Confidential: The Secret Life of J. Edgar Hoover, by Anthony Summers, Putnam (1993).
FBI Records: The Vault - Melvin Purvis, Federal Bureau of Investigation, June 12, 2018
 ''Dillinger, The Hidden Truth-Reloaded: Gangster's and G-Men of the Great Depression, by Tony Stewart, Lulu Publishing (2010).

External links

Melvin Purvis at WorldCat Identities

1903 births
1960 deaths
People from Timmonsville, South Carolina
Federal Bureau of Investigation agents
John Dillinger
20th-century American memoirists
United States Army colonels
United States Army personnel of World War II
University of South Carolina alumni
Firearm accident victims in the United States
Accidental deaths in South Carolina
Deaths by firearm in South Carolina
Burials in South Carolina
Anti-crime activists